Lorraine York is a Canadian literary historian in English and Cultural Studies, currently the Senator William McMaster Chair in Canadian Literature and Culture at McMaster University.

York is named Fellow of the Royal Society of Canada 2017, together with Margery Fee and Lucie Hotte.

References

Year of birth missing (living people)
Living people
Academic staff of McMaster University
21st-century Canadian historians
Fellows of the Royal Society of Canada